HLE or hle may refer to:

Transportation
 Heiligerlee railway stop (Station code Hle), the Netherlands
 Hillington East railway station (Station code HLE), Scotland
 Saint Helena Airport (IATA airport code), Saint Helena

Science and technology
 Hardware Lock Elision, part of Intel's Transactional Synchronization Extensions
 High-level emulation, is an emulator for the Nintendo 64

Other uses
 Happy life expectancy, life expectancy multiplied by a happiness index
 Harold Lloyd Entertainment
 HLE (singer), stage name of South African gospel singer Hlengiwe Ntombela
 Hlersu language (ISO 639-3 code), spoken in China
Holy Land Experience, a theme park in Orlando, Florida, US